Vastse-Kuuste is a small borough in Põlva Parish, Põlva County in southeastern Estonia. Before the administrative reform in 2017, Vastse-Kuuste was the administrative centre of Vastse-Kuuste Parish.

References 

Boroughs and small boroughs in Estonia